997 Priska, provisional designation , is a carbonaceous Adeonian asteroid from the central regions of the asteroid belt, approximately 19 kilometers in diameter. It was discovered on 12 July 1923, by astronomer Karl Reinmuth at the Heidelberg-Königstuhl State Observatory in southwest Germany. The asteroid's name is a common German female name, unrelated to the discoverer's contemporaries.

Orbit and classification 

Priska is a member of the Adeona family, a large family of carbonaceous asteroids in the central main belt, named after 145 Adeona. It orbits the Sun at a distance of 2.2–3.2 AU once every 4 years and 4 months (1,592 days). Its orbit has an eccentricity of 0.18 and an inclination of 11° with respect to the ecliptic.

The body's observation arc begins with its official discovery observation at Heidelberg.

Physical characteristics 

In the SMASS classification, Priska is a Ch-subtype, a hydrated carbonaceous C-type asteroid.

Rotation period 

In August 2006, a rotational lightcurve of Priska was obtained from photometric observations by Italian amateur astronomers Roberto Crippa and Federico Manzini. Lightcurve analysis gave a rotation period of 16.22 hours with a brightness amplitude of 0.61 magnitude. A high brightness variation is typically indicative for an elongated rather than spherical shape.

Diameter and albedo 

According to the surveys carried out by the Infrared Astronomical Satellite IRAS, the Japanese Akari satellite and the NEOWISE mission of NASA's Wide-field Infrared Survey Explorer, Priska measures between 16.71 and 20.391 kilometers in diameter and its surface has an albedo between 0.037 and 0.088.

The Collaborative Asteroid Lightcurve Link derives an albedo of 0.0511 and a diameter of 18.59 kilometers based on an absolute magnitude of 12.5.

Naming 

This minor planet was named after a girl's name picked from the German popular calendar .

Reinmuth's Calendar Girls 

As with 913 Otila and 1144 Oda, Reinmuth selected names from this calendar due to his many asteroid discoveries that he had trouble thinking of proper names. These names are not related to the discoverer's contemporaries. The author of the Dictionary of Minor Planet Names learned about Reinmuth's source of inspiration from private communications with Dutch astronomer Ingrid van Houten-Groeneveld, who worked as a young astronomer at Heidelberg.

References

External links 
 Asteroid Lightcurve Database (LCDB), query form (info )
 Dictionary of Minor Planet Names, Google books
 Asteroids and comets rotation curves, CdR – Observatoire de Genève, Raoul Behrend
 Discovery Circumstances: Numbered Minor Planets (1)-(5000) – Minor Planet Center
 
 

000997
Discoveries by Karl Wilhelm Reinmuth
Named minor planets
000997
19230712